Kjell Thorbjørn Kristensen (14 February 1927 – 26 February 1995) was a Norwegian politician for the Labour Party.

From August to September 1972, during Bratteli's First Cabinet, Kristensen was a State Secretary in the Office of the Prime Minister. He served as a deputy representative to the Norwegian Parliament from Telemark during the terms 1958–1961 and 1961–1965.

References

1927 births
1995 deaths
Norwegian state secretaries
Deputy members of the Storting
Labour Party (Norway) politicians
Politicians from Telemark